Nagykáta is a district in eastern part of Pest County. Nagykáta is also the name of the town where the district seat is found. The district is located in the Central Hungary Statistical Region.

Geography 
Nagykáta District borders with Jászberény District (Jász-Nagykun-Szolnok County) to the northeast, Szolnok District (Jász-Nagykun-Szolnok County) to the east, Cegléd District to the south, Monor District and Vecsés District to the southwest, Aszód District to the northwest. The number of the inhabited places in Nagykáta District is 15.

Municipalities 
The district has 3 towns, 2 large villages and 10 villages.
(ordered by population, as of 1 January 2013)

The bolded municipalities are cities, italics municipalities are large villages.

Demographics

In 2011, it had a population of 73,959 and the population density was 104/km².

Ethnicity
Besides the Hungarian majority, the main minorities are the Roma (approx. 2,250), German and Romanian (275).

Total population (2011 census): 73,959
Ethnic groups (2011 census): Identified themselves: 67,414 persons:
Hungarians: 64,033 (94.98%)
Gypsies: 2,233 (3.31%)
Others and indefinable: 1,148 (1.70%)
Approx. 5,500 persons in Nagykáta District did not declare their ethnic group at the 2011 census.

Religion
Religious adherence in the county according to 2011 census:

Catholic – 37,980 (Roman Catholic – 37,697; Greek Catholic – 277);
Reformed – 5,474;
Evangelical – 1,527;
other religions – 1,251; 
Non-religious – 8,408; 
Atheism – 556;
Undeclared – 18,763.

Gallery

See also
List of cities and towns in Hungary

References

External links
 Postal codes of the Nagykáta District

Districts in Pest County